Donna Vekić was the defending champion, having won the event in 2013, but chose not to participate.

Denisa Allertová won the tournament, defeating Yuliya Beygelzimer in the final, 6–2, 6–3.

Seeds

Main draw

Finals

Top half

Bottom half

References 
 Main draw

Lale Cup - Singles
Lale Cup